USS Enterprise (CV-6) was a  carrier built for the United States Navy during the 1930s. She was the seventh U.S. Navy vessel of that name. Colloquially called "The Big E", she was the sixth aircraft carrier of the United States Navy. Launched in 1936, she was one of only three American carriers commissioned before World War II to survive the war (the others being  and ). She participated in more major actions of the war against Japan than any other United States ship. These actions included the attack on Pearl Harbor — 18 Douglas SBD Dauntless dive bombers of her air group arrived over the harbor during the attack; seven were shot down with eight airmen killed and two wounded, making her the only American aircraft carrier with men at Pearl Harbor during the attack and the first to sustain casualties during the Pacific War — the Battle of Midway, the Battle of the Eastern Solomons, the Battle of the Santa Cruz Islands, various other air-sea engagements during the Guadalcanal Campaign, the Battle of the Philippine Sea, and the Battle of Leyte Gulf. Enterprise earned 20 battle stars, the most for any U.S. warship in World War II, and was the most decorated U.S. ship of World War II. She was also the first American ship to sink a full-sized enemy warship after the Pacific War had been declared when her aircraft sank the Japanese submarine I-70 on 10 December 1941. On three occasions during the war, the Japanese announced that she had been sunk in battle, inspiring her nickname "The Grey Ghost". By the end of the war, her planes and guns had downed 911 enemy planes, sunk 71 ships, and damaged or destroyed 192 more.

Despite efforts made by the public after the war to turn Enterprise into a museum ship, Enterprise was ultimately scrapped from 1958 to 1960.

Construction and commissioning
Enterprise sailed south on a shakedown cruise which took her to Rio de Janeiro. Captain Charles A. Pownall relieved White on 21 December. After her return, she operated along the East Coast and in the Caribbean until April 1939, when she was ordered to duty in the Pacific.

Service history

Enterprise was one of fourteen ships to receive the early RCA CXAM-1 radar. Captain George D. Murray assumed command of the carrier on 21 March 1941. Based first at San Diego (where she was used in the filming of Dive Bomber, starring Errol Flynn and Fred MacMurray) and then at Pearl Harbor on the Hawaiian island of Oahu after President Roosevelt ordered the Fleet to be "forward based," the carrier and her Air Group trained intensively and transported aircraft to American island bases in the Pacific. Enterprise and the other ships of Task Force 8 (TF 8) departed Pearl Harbor on 28 November 1941 to deliver Marine Fighter Squadron 211 (VMF-211) to Wake Island nearly  due west.

World War II

Pearl Harbor

Enterprise launched eighteen of her SBDs - the CAG's aircraft, 13 aircraft from Scouting Squadron Six (VS-6) and four aircraft from Bombing Squadron Six (VB-6) - at dawn on 7 December to scout an arc extending from the northeast to southeast of the ship, and to land at Ford Island at Pearl Harbor after completing their search routes. As these aircraft arrived in pairs over Pearl Harbor, they were caught between attacking Japanese aircraft and defensive anti-aircraft fire from the ships and shore installations below.  Seven SBDs were shot down, either from enemy action or friendly fire, with the loss of eight airmen killed and two wounded.

Enterprise received radio messages from Pearl Harbor reporting that the base was under attack, and she was later directed to launch an airstrike based on an inaccurate report of a Japanese carrier southwest of her location. The strike was launched around 17:00, consisting of six Grumman F4F Wildcat fighters of Fighting Squadron Six (VF-6), 18 Douglas TBD Devastator torpedo bombers of Torpedo Squadron Six (VT-6), and six SBDs of VB-6.

Unable to locate any targets, the torpedo and dive bombers returned to Enterprise, but the six fighters were directed to divert to Hickam Field on Oahu.  Although word of the planes' expected arrival had been broadcast to all ships and anti-aircraft units in the area, the appearance of the Wildcats in the night sky over Oahu triggered panic firing, which shot down three of them, killing their pilots, while a fourth aircraft ran out of fuel, forcing the pilot to bail out.

Enterprise pulled into Pearl Harbor for fuel and supplies on the evening of 8 December. Vice-Admiral William Halsey Jr., commander of Carrier Division 2, ordered every able-bodied man on board to help rearm and refuel Enterprise; this process normally took 24 hours to complete, but was completed this time within seven hours. She and the other ships of TF 8 sailed early the next morning to patrol against possible additional attacks on the Hawaiian Islands.

During the last two weeks of December 1941, Enterprise and her escorts steamed west of Hawaii to cover the islands while two other carrier groups made a belated attempt to relieve Wake Island. After a brief layover at Pearl Harbor, Enterprise and her group sailed on 11 January 1942, protecting convoys reinforcing Samoa.

On 16 January 1942, a TBD of VT-6, piloted by Chief Aviation Machinist's Mate and enlisted Naval Aviation Pilot Harold F. Dixon, got lost on patrol, ran out of fuel, and ditched. Dixon and his two crewmates, bombardier Anthony J. Pastula and gunner Gene Aldrich, survived for 34 days in a small rubber raft after their food and water were washed overboard, before drifting ashore on the atoll of Pukapuka, where the natives fed them and notified Allied authorities. Dixon was awarded the Navy Cross for "extraordinary heroism, exceptional determination, resourcefulness, skilled seamanship, excellent judgment and highest quality of leadership."

On 1 February 1942, Enterprises Task Force 8 raided Kwajalein, Wotje, and Maloelap in the Marshall Islands, sinking three Japanese ships, damaging eight, and destroying numerous airplanes and ground facilities. Enterprise received only minor damage in the Japanese counterattack, as TF 8 retired to Pearl Harbor.

The next month, Enterprise, now part of Task Force 16, swept the central Pacific, attacking enemy installations on Wake and Marcus Islands.

Doolittle Raid, April 1942 

After minor alterations and repairs at Pearl Harbor, Enterprise and TF 16 departed on 8 April 1942 to rendezvous with her sister ship  and sailed west, escorting Hornet on the mission to launch 16 Army B-25 Mitchells in the "Doolittle Raid" on Tokyo. While fighters from Enterprise flew combat air patrol, the B-25s launched on 18 April, and flew undetected the remaining  to the target. The task force, its presence known to the enemy after a Japanese picket boat radioed a warning, reversed course and returned to Pearl Harbor on 25 April.

Battle of Midway, June 1942 

Five days later, Enterprise sortied toward the South Pacific to reinforce U.S. carriers operating in the Coral Sea. However, the Battle of the Coral Sea was over before Enterprise arrived. With Hornet, she performed a feint towards Nauru and Banaba (Ocean) islands which caused the Japanese to delay  Operation RY to seize the two islands, Enterprise returned to Pearl Harbor on 26 May 1942, and began intensive preparation to meet the expected Japanese thrust at Midway Island.

On 28 May, Enterprise departed Pearl Harbor as Rear Admiral Raymond A. Spruance's flagship with orders "to hold Midway and inflict maximum damage on the enemy by strong attrition tactics". With Enterprise in TF 16 were Hornet, six cruisers, ten destroyers and four oilers. Vice Admiral Halsey, the usual commander of TF 16 and senior to both Fletcher and Spruance, was medically ordered to remain in a naval hospital at Pearl Harbor due to stress-induced severe weight loss and severe psoriasis.

Each side launched air attacks during the day in a decisive battle. Though the forces were in contact until 7 June, by 10:45am on 4 June the outcome had been decided. Three Japanese carriers were burning and it was only a matter of time until a fourth was caught and knocked out. The Battle of Midway began on the morning of 4 June 1942, when four Japanese carriers, unaware of the presence of U.S. naval forces, launched attacks on Midway Island. Shortly after the first bomb fell on Midway, the first wave of planes (4 B-26B Marauders, 6 TBF-1 Avengers,11 SB2U-3s, 16 SBDs and 15 B-17s) from Midway Island attacked unsuccessfully. Several more groups attacked, again failing to damage their targets. Planes from the U.S. carriers attacked next. Enterprise torpedo bombers attacked first, scoring no hits and suffering heavy losses.

Within an hour, the remaining Japanese carrier, launched air strikes that crippled Yorktown with three bombs and two torpedoes striking home during two separate attacks. In late afternoon, a mixed squadron of Enterprise and Yorktown bombers, flying from Enterprise, disabled Hiryu, leaving her burning. The following day Enterprise dive bombers alone sank the cruiser Mikuma. Japanese losses were much higher: four carriers (all scuttled), one cruiser and 272 carrier aircraft with many of their highly experienced aircrews. Despite losses to her aircraft squadrons, Enterprise came through undamaged and returned to Pearl Harbor on 13 June 1942.

South Pacific

Captain Arthur C. Davis relieved Murray on 30 June 1942. After a month of rest and overhaul, Enterprise sailed on 15 July 1942 for the South Pacific, where she joined TF 61 to support the amphibious landings in the Solomon Islands on 8 August. For the next two weeks, the carrier and her planes guarded seaborne communication lines southwest of the Solomons. In the ensuing Battle of the Eastern Solomons, the light carrier  was sunk, and the Japanese troops intended for Guadalcanal were forced back. Enterprise suffered the most heavily of the American ships; three direct bomb hits and four near misses killed 74, wounded 95, and inflicted serious damage on the carrier. Quick, hard work by damage control parties patched her up so that she was able to return to Hawaii under her own power.

Repaired at Pearl Harbor from 10 September–16 October 1942, Enterprise embarked Air Group 10 in early October. This was the first time that the Grim Reapers of VF-10 deployed from Enterprise under commanding officer James H. Flatley, who became known as "Reaper Leader." She departed once more for the South Pacific, where with Hornet she formed TF 61, although Captain Osborne Hardison relieved Davis on 21 October. Five days later, Enterprise scout planes located a Japanese carrier force and the Battle of the Santa Cruz Islands was under way. Enterprise aircraft struck carriers and cruisers during the struggle, while the ship herself underwent intensive attack. Hit twice by bombs, Enterprise lost 44 men and had 75 wounded. Despite serious damage, she remained in action and took on board a large number of planes and crewmen from Hornet when that carrier was sunk. Though the American losses of a carrier and a destroyer were more severe than the Japanese loss of one light cruiser, the battle gave the Americans time to reinforce Guadalcanal against the next enemy onslaught, and nearby Henderson Field was therefore secure from the Japanese bombardment. The loss of Hornet meant Enterprise was now the only functioning (albeit damaged) U.S. carrier in the Pacific Theater. On one of the decks, the crew posted a sign: "Enterprise vs Japan."

Enterprise reached Nouméa, New Caledonia on 30 October for repairs, but a new Japanese thrust at the Solomons demanded her presence and she sailed on 11 November, with repair crews from  still working on board. Part of the repair crew were 75 Seabees from Company B of the 3rd Construction Battalion.  This was due to a shortage of fleet repair resources.  Underway with orders to engage the enemy, the Seabees focused on effecting repairs even during the forthcoming battle.  The work was under the round-the-clock supervision of Enterprises damage control officer, Lt. Cmdr. Herschel Albert Smith.

The commanding officer of Enterprise, Captain Osborne Bennett "Ozzie B" "Oby" Hardison, notified the Navy Department that "the emergency repairs accomplished by this skillful, well-trained, and enthusiastically energetic force have placed this vessel in condition for further action against the enemy." The repairs were completed by these men with speed and efficiency. I hereby commend them for their willingness, zeal, and capability."

When the Naval Battle of Guadalcanal ended on 15 November 1942, Enterprise had shared in sinking sixteen ships and damaging eight more. The carrier returned to Nouméa on 16 November to complete her repairs.

Sailing again on 4 December, Enterprise trained out of Espiritu Santo, New Hebrides, until 28 January 1943, when she departed for the Solomons area. On 30 January, her fighters flew combat air patrol for a cruiser–destroyer group during the Battle of Rennell Island. Despite the destruction of most of the attacking Japanese bombers by Enterprise planes, the heavy cruiser  was sunk by aerial torpedoes.

Detached after the battle, the carrier arrived at Espiritu Santo on 1 February, and for the next three months operated out of that base, covering U.S. surface forces up to the Solomons. Captain Samuel Ginder assumed command of the ship on 16 April. Enterprise then steamed to Pearl Harbor where, on 27 May 1943, Admiral Chester Nimitz presented the ship with the first Presidential Unit citation awarded to an aircraft carrier.

In the summer of 1943, with the new  and  carriers joining the American Pacific Fleet, Enterprise was temporarily relieved of duty, and on 20 July, she entered Puget Sound Naval Shipyard for a much-needed overhaul. Over the course of several months, Enterprise received an extensive refit, which included, among other upgrades, new anti-aircraft weapons and an anti-torpedo blister that significantly improved her underwater protection. This mid-war refit is where she would receive her two iconic "6"s on her flight decks.

Return to duty
Captain Matthias Gardner relieved Ginder on 7 November. Back at Pearl Harbor on 6 November, Enterprise left four days later to provide close air support to the 27th Infantry Division landing on Makin Atoll, during the Battle of Makin, from 19–21 November 1943. On the night of 26 November, Enterprise introduced carrier-based night fighters to the Pacific when a three-plane team from the ship broke up a large group of land-based bombers attacking TG 50.2. Two of the three planes returned to the ship, with LCDR Edward "Butch" O'Hare the only casualty. After a heavy strike by aircraft of TF 50 against Kwajalein on 4 December, Enterprise returned to Pearl Harbor five days later.

The carrier's next operation was with the Fast Carrier Task Force in softening up the Marshall Islands and supporting the landings on Kwajalein, from 29 January-3 February 1944. Then, Enterprise sailed, still with TF 58, to strike the Japanese naval base at Truk Lagoon in the Caroline Islands, on 17 February. Again Enterprise made aviation history, when she launched the first night radar bombing attack from a U.S. carrier. The twelve torpedo bombers in this strike achieved excellent results, accounting for nearly one-third of the 200,000 tons of shipping destroyed by aircraft.

Detached from TF 58 with escorts, Enterprise launched raids on Jaluit Atoll on 20 February, then steamed to Majuro and Espiritu Santo. Sailing on 15 March in TG 36.1, she provided air cover and close support for the landings on Emirau Island (19–25 March). The carrier rejoined TF 58 on 26 March, and for the next 12 days, joined in a series of strikes against the islands of Yap, Ulithi, Woleai, and Palau. After a week's rest and replenishment at Majuro, Enterprise sailed on 14 April to support landings in the Hollandia (currently known as Jayapura) area of New Guinea, and then hit Truk again from 29–30 April.

On 6 June 1944, she and her companions of TG 58.3 sortied from Majuro to join the rest of TF 58 in attacking the Marianas Islands. Striking Saipan, Rota, and Guam from 11–14 June, Enterprise pilots gave direct support to the landings on Saipan on 15 June, and covered the troops ashore for the next two days.

Aware of a major Japanese attempt to break up the invasion of Saipan, Admiral Spruance, now Commander 5th Fleet, positioned TF 58 to meet the threat.

Battle of the Philippine Sea
On 19 June 1944, Enterprise was one of four carriers of Task Group 58.3 under the command of Rear Admiral John W. Reeves' during the largest carrier aircraft battle in history: the Battle of the Philippine Sea. For over eight hours, airmen of the United States and Imperial Japanese navies fought in the skies over TF 58 and the Marianas. Over the course of two days, a total of six American ships were damaged, and 130 planes and a total of 76 pilots and aircrew were lost. In sharp contrast, American carrier aircraft, with a major assist from U.S. submarines, sank three Japanese carriers (and ), and destroyed 426 carrier aircraft, losses from which Japanese naval aviation would never recover.

Enterprise participated both in the defense of the fleet and in the subsequent early-evening strike against the Japanese task forces. During the chaotic after-dark recovery of the air strike, a fighter and a bomber came aboard simultaneously, but fortunately did not cause an accident. A planned midnight strike against the Japanese fleet by night-flying Enterprise pilots was cancelled because of the recovery and rescue operations required after the dusk attack. After the battle, Enterprise and her Task Group continued to provide air support for the invasion of Saipan through 5 July. She then sailed for Pearl Harbor and a month of rest and overhaul, during which she was painted in Measure 33/4Ab Dazzle camouflage. During this time, Gardner was replaced by Commander Thomas Hamilton on 10 July before he was relieved in his turn by Captain Cato Glover on 29 July. Back in action on 24 August, the carrier sailed with TF 38 in that force's aerial assault on the Volcano and Bonin Islands from 31 August – 2 September, and Yap, Ulithi, and the Palaus from 6–8 September.

Battle of Leyte Gulf
After operating west of the Palau Islands, Enterprise joined other units of TF 38 on 7 October and set course to the north. From 10–20 October, her aviators flew over Okinawa, Formosa, and the Philippines, blasting enemy airfields, shore installations, and shipping in preparation for the assault on Leyte. After supporting the Leyte landings on 20 October, Enterprise headed for Ulithi to replenish, but the approach of the Japanese fleet on 23 October called her back to action.

In the Battle of Leyte Gulf (23–26 October), Enterprise planes struck all three groups of enemy forces, battering battleships and destroyers before the action ended. The carrier remained on patrol east of Samar and Leyte until the end of October, then retired to Ulithi for supplies. During November, her aircraft struck targets in the Manila area, and at the island of Yap. She returned to Pearl Harbor on 6 December 1944 and Glover was replaced by Captain Grover B. H. Hall on 14 December.

Luzon and Tokyo
Sailing on 24 December for the Philippines, Enterprise carried  an air group specially trained in night carrier operations; as the only carrier capable of night operations, she left Oahu with her hull code changed from CV to CV(N), the "N" representing "Night". She joined TG 38.5 and swept the waters north of Luzon and of the South China Sea during January 1945, striking shore targets and shipping from Formosa to Indo-China including an attack on Macau. After a brief visit to Ulithi, Enterprise joined TG 58.5 on 10 February 1945, and provided day and night combat air patrol for TF 58 as it struck Tokyo on 16–17 February.

Iwo Jima
She then supported the Marines in the Battle of Iwo Jima from 19 February – 9 March, when she sailed for Ulithi. During one part of that period, Enterprise kept aircraft aloft continuously over Iwo Jima for 174 hours.

Okinawa
Departing Ulithi on 15 March, the carrier continued her night work in raids against Kyūshū, Honshū, and shipping in the Inland Sea of Japan. Damaged lightly by an enemy bomb on 18 March, Enterprise entered Ulithi six days later for repairs. Back in action on 5 April, she supported the Okinawa operation until she was damaged on 11 April—this time by a kamikaze—and was forced back to Ulithi. Off Okinawa once more on 6 May, Enterprise flew patrols around the clock as kamikaze attacks increased. On 14 May 1945, she suffered her last wound of World War II when a kamikaze Zero, piloted by Lt. J.G. Shunsuke Tomiyasu, destroyed her forward elevator, killing 13 and wounding 68.

The carrier sailed for the Puget Sound Navy Yard, where she underwent repairs and an overhaul from 12 June-31 August 1945. The war ended with the Japanese surrender on 2 September 1945.

Aviation complement 
The following aviation complement was disembarked from Enterprise on 7 September 1945 at NAS Barber's Point;

United States Pacific Fleet - Navy Carrier Air Group 52 (CVGN-52) - NYD SEATTLE 1x Grumman F6F-5 Hellcat - ship's flight
VFN-52 - 22x F6F-5 + 15x F6F-5P
VTN-52 (torpedo bomber squadron) - 16x General Motors TBM-3E Avenger

Post war

Operation Magic Carpet

Restored to peak condition, Enterprise voyaged to Pearl Harbor, returning to the States with some 1,141 servicemen due for discharge, including hospital patients and former POWs, then sailed on to New York on 25 September 1945 via the Panama Canal arriving on 17 October 1945. Two weeks later, she proceeded to Boston for installation of additional berthing facilities, then began a series of three Operation Magic Carpet voyages to Europe, bringing home more than 10,000 veterans in her final service to her country.

The first European voyage returned 4,668 servicemen from Southampton, England, in November 1945. On the second trip to Europe, she was boarded by the British First Lord of the Admiralty, Sir Albert Alexander in Southampton, who presented Enterprise with a British Admiralty pennant that was hoisted when a majority of the Admiralty Board members were present. The pennant was given to Enterprise as a token of respect from several high-ranking officers of an ally. She returned to New York on 25 December 1945 with 4,413 servicemen. According to damage control officer John U. Monro, the storms smashed sections of walkways and railings, and swept loose objects overboard. Her last voyage was to the Azores, and returned 3,557 personnel, including 212 WACs to New York on 17 January 1946.

The end for Enterprise

With the commissioning of over two dozen larger and more advanced aircraft carriers by end of 1945, Enterprise was deemed surplus for the post-war needs of America's navy. She entered the New York Naval Shipyard on 18 January 1946 for deactivation and was decommissioned on 17 February 1947. In 1946, she had been scheduled to be handed over to the state of New York as a permanent memorial, but this plan was suspended in 1949. Subsequent attempts were made at preserving the ship as a museum or memorial, but fund-raising efforts failed to raise enough money to buy the vessel from the Navy, and Enterprise was sold on 1 July 1958 to the Lipsett Corporation of New York City for scrapping at Kearny, New Jersey.

A promise was made to save the distinctive tripod mast for inclusion in the Naval Academy's new football stadium, but was never fulfilled; instead, a memorial plaque was installed at the base of what is still called "Enterprise Tower." Scrapping was complete as of May 1960. In 1984, a permanent "Enterprise Exhibit" was dedicated at the Naval Aviation Museum, Naval Air Station Pensacola, Florida, to house artifacts, photos, and other items of historical interest. 

Her commissioning plaque and one of her anchors are on display at the Washington Navy Yard in Washington, D.C.

Successors to Enterprise
The name was revived in February 1958 when the world's first nuclear-powered aircraft carrier was laid down as the eighth Enterprise; this ship was commissioned in November 1961. Also nicknamed the "Big E", various artifacts and mementos were kept aboard from her predecessor. The port holes in the captain's in-port cabin and conference room are only one example. She was inactivated and removed from service on 1 December 2012 after being in the fleet for 51 years. Due to considerations arising from reactor removal, she cannot be turned into a memorial. At her inactivation, it was announced that the ninth ship to bear the name Enterprise would be the planned , CVN-80. It has not been confirmed what, if any, artifacts from USS Enterprise (CV-6) will be incorporated into this next generation aircraft carrier, although a time capsule containing mementos from both CV-6 and CVN-65 will be presented to the first captain of the new Enterprise. The aforementioned port holes aboard the CVN-65 will be removed and returned to the Boston Navy Yard Museum.

Awards and commendations

Enterprise was awarded a Presidential Unit Citation for her service during World War II. The citation states:

In addition to her Presidential Unit Citation, Enterprise received the Navy Unit Commendation and 20 battle stars for World War II service, making her the highest decorated U.S. ship of the war.

Finally, she was presented with a British Admiralty pennant that was hoisted when a majority of the Admiralty Board members were present. The pennant was given to Enterprise as an unofficial token of respect from an ally.

Legacy
 Gene Roddenberry, creator of the television show, Star Trek, named his fictional starship in honor of CV-6 early on in the development of the show, because he was "particularly fascinated" by her war record, and had "always considered it a heroic ship". In doing so, he replaced the name S.S. Yorktown (named after Enterprises sister ship) he had originally envisioned for his fictional starship, when he conceived the show in early 1964.
 Jack C. Taylor, founder of Enterprise Rent-A-Car, had served on Enterprise as a fighter pilot during the war, and (re-)named his company in 1969 after the ship.

Footnotes

References

Bibliography

Further reading

External links

USS Enterprise (CV-6) photography collection  (Naval History and Heritage Command)
USS Enterprise (CV-6) aircraft carrier photo archive (NavSource.org)
 Newsreel coverage of Enterprise being taken to scrapyard (begins at 0:53 mark)
A film of the attacks on Enterprise on 24 August 1942. The film was taken by 2nd Class Marion Riley, who operated a motion picture camera from the aft end of the ship's island, above the flight deck.
 Author Webcast Interview Barrett Tillman on the USS Enterprise (CV-6) at the Pritzker Military Library on 23 February 2012
USS Enterprise damage reports
Crash landings on the carrier USS Enterprise in 1939

Yorktown-class aircraft carriers
1936 ships
World War II aircraft carriers of the United States
Ships of the Battle of Midway
Ships built in Newport News, Virginia